Romain Etwaroo (born 16 December 1946) is a Guyanese cricketer. He played in twenty-four first-class and two List A matches for Guyana from 1971 to 1982.

See also
 List of Guyanese representative cricketers

References

External links
 

1946 births
Living people
Guyanese cricketers
Guyana cricketers